Ali Fethi Okyar (29 April 1880 – 7 May 1943) was a Turkish diplomat and politician, who also served as a military officer and diplomat during the last decade of the Ottoman Empire. He was also the second Prime Minister of Turkey (1924–1925) and the second Speaker of the Turkish Parliament after Mustafa Kemal Atatürk.

Biography 
He was born in the Ottoman town of Prilep in Manastir Vilayet (present-day North Macedonia) to an Albanian family.
In 1913, he joined the Committee of Union and Progress (İttihat ve Terakki Cemiyeti) and was elected as the secretary general. In 1924 he was appointed Prime Minister as the successor of İsmet İnönü. But only a few months later in March 1925 he was replaced again by İnönü as a more decisive policy was needed to suppress the Sheikh Said rebellion. Following he was appointed the Turkish ambassador to France in Paris. In 1930, he received the permission to establish the Serbest Cumhuriyet Fırkası (Liberal Republican Party), an early party of opposition. However, when the government noticed the support of this opposition party among Islamists, it was declared illegal and closed down, a situation similar to that of the Progressive Republican Party, which had lasted for a few months in 1924. He later served as Justice Minister from 1939 to 1941.

References

Bibliography

External links
 

1880 births
1943 deaths
20th-century prime ministers of Turkey
People from Prilep
People from Manastir vilayet
Macedonian Turks
Committee of Union and Progress politicians
Republican People's Party (Turkey) politicians
Liberal Republican Party (Turkey) politicians
Prime Ministers of Turkey
Ministers of National Defence of Turkey
Turkish people of Albanian descent
Ministers of Justice of Turkey
Government ministers of Turkey
Speakers of the Parliament of Turkey
Deputies of Istanbul
Monastir Military High School alumni
Ottoman Military Academy alumni
Ottoman Military College alumni
Ottoman Army officers
Members of the Special Organization (Ottoman Empire)
Ottoman military personnel of the Italo-Turkish War
Ottoman military personnel of the Balkan Wars
Malta exiles
Ambassadors of Turkey to France
Ambassadors of Turkey to the United Kingdom
Burials at Zincirlikuyu Cemetery
Leaders of the Opposition (Turkey)
Members of the 3rd government of Turkey
Members of the 12th government of Turkey